Safi Faye (November 22, 1943 – February 22, 2023) was a Senegalese film director and ethnologist. She was the first Sub-Saharan African woman to direct a commercially distributed feature film, Kaddu Beykat, which was released in 1975. She has directed several documentary and fiction films focusing on rural life in Senegal.

Biography

Early life and education
Safi Faye was born in 1943 in Dakar, Senegal, to an aristocratic Serer family. Her parents, the Fayes, were from Fad'jal, a village south of Dakar. She attended the Normal School in Rufisque and receiving her teaching certificate in 1962 or 1963, began teaching in Dakar.

In 1966 she went to the Dakar Festival of Negro Arts and met French ethnologist and filmmaker Jean Rouch. He encouraged her to use film making as an ethnographic tool. She had an acting role in his 1971 film Petit à petit. Faye has said that she dislikes Rouch's film but that working with him enabled her to learn about filmmaking and cinéma-vérité. In the 1970s she studied ethnology at the École pratique des hautes études and then at the Lumière Film School. She supported herself by working as a model, an actor and in film sound effects. In 1979, she received a PhD in ethnology from the University of Paris. From 1979 to 1980, Faye studied video production in Berlin and was a guest lecturer at the Free University of Berlin. She received a further degree in ethnology from the Sorbonne in 1988.

Film career
About Faye's work, the film programmer and scholar Janaína Oliveira has written:
"Since the beginning of her career, Faye has been driven by a desire to speak about her community, for her community, and, above all, with her community. In this case, the prepositions do matter. They guide both the reasons that led her to study ethnology in France and her appropriation of cinema as a means of expanding her research."

Faye's first film, in which she also acted, was a 1972 short called La Passante (The Passerby), drawn from her experiences as a foreign woman in Paris. It follows a woman (Faye) walking down a street and noticing the reactions of men nearby. Faye's first feature film was Kaddu Beykat, which means The Voice of the Peasant in Wolof and was known internationally as Letter from My Village or News from My Village. She obtained financial backing for Kaddu Beykat from the French Ministry of Cooperation. Released in 1975, it was the first feature film to be made by a Sub-Saharan African woman to be commercially distributed and gained international recognition for Faye. On its release it was banned in Senegal. In 1976 it won the FIPRESCI Prize from the International Federation of Film Critics (tied with Chhatrabhang) and the OCIC Award.

Faye's 1983 documentary film Selbe: One Among Many follows a 39-year-old woman called Selbé who works to support her eight children since her husband has left their village to look for work. Selbé regularly converses with Faye, who remains off-screen, and describes her relationship with her husband and daily life in the village.

Personal life
Faye, who lived in Paris, had one daughter. She died in Paris on February 22, 2023 at age 79.

Filmography
1972: La Passante (The Passerby)
1975: Kaddu Beykat (Letter from My Village)
1979: Fad'jal (Come and work)
1979: Goob na nu (The harvest is in)
1980: Man Sa Yay (I, Your Mother)
1981: Les âmes au soleil (Souls under the Sun)
1983: Selbe: One Among Many (or Selbe and So Many Others)
1983: 3 ans 5 mois (Three years five months)
1985: Racines noires (Black Roots)
1985: Elsie Haas, femme peintre et cinéaste d'Haiti (Elsie Haas, Haitian Woman Painter and Filmmaker)
1989: Tesito
1996: Mossane

References

Bibliography

External links

1943 births
Senegalese ethnologists
Women ethnologists
Living people
People from Dakar
Safi
Senegalese anthropologists
Senegalese film actresses
Senegalese film directors
Senegalese women film directors
Serer anthropologists
Serer film directors
Serer actresses